Jacqueline Lucienne Alquier (born 29 July 1947) is a French politician. She is a senator in the Senate of France, representing the Tarn department. She is a member of the Socialist Party. She is also a councillor on the Regional Council of Midi-Pyrénées, representing the Tarn department. From 1985 to 1986 and 1988 to 1993, she was a Deputy representing Tarn in the National Assembly.

Early life 
Alquier was born on 29 July 1947 in Vabre, Tarn, France. Her parents were Emile Bardou and Julia Bardou (née Loup). She married André Alquier in 1968, the same year that she got a job as a secretary.

Political career 
Alquier became a deputy mayor in 1977 and departmental councillor for 1979 for Labruguière. She served as the vice chair of the Departmental Council for Tarn between 1982 and 1985.

References

Page on the Senate website

1947 births
Living people
Women members of the Senate (France)
French Senators of the Fifth Republic
Socialist Party (France) politicians
Senators of Tarn (department)